The Balkans campaign of World War II began with the Italian invasion of Greece on 28 October 1940. In the early months of 1941, Italy's offensive had stalled and a Greek counter-offensive pushed into Albania. Germany sought to aid Italy by deploying troops to Romania and Bulgaria and attacking Greece from the east. Meanwhile, the British landed troops and aircraft to shore up Greek defences. A coup d'état in Yugoslavia on 27 March caused Adolf Hitler to order the conquest of that country.

The invasion of Yugoslavia by Germany and Italy began on 6 April 1941, simultaneously with the new Battle of Greece; on 11 April, Hungary joined the invasion. By 17 April the Yugoslavs had signed an armistice, and by 30 April all of mainland Greece was under German or Italian control. On 20 May Germany invaded Crete by air, and by 1 June all remaining Greek and British forces on the island had surrendered. Although it had not participated in the attacks in April, Bulgaria occupied parts of both Yugoslavia and Greece shortly thereafter for the remainder of the war in the Balkans.

Background

After World War I, with the complete collapse of the Ottoman Empire and the Austro-Hungarian Empire, the Albanians looked to the Kingdom of Italy for protection against its traditional enemies. In 1919, Albania's territorial integrity was confirmed at the Paris Peace Conference after United States President Woodrow Wilson opposed a plan by the European powers to divide Albania amongst its neighbors. However, after 1925, Italian dictator Benito Mussolini sought to dominate Albania. In 1928, Albania became a kingdom under Zog I, who was a clan chief and former Prime Minister. Zog failed to stave off Italian ascendancy in Albanian internal affairs. On 7 April 1939, Mussolini's troops occupied Albania, overthrew Zog, and annexed the country to the Italian Empire.

Campaign

Greco-Italian War

The Italian invasion of Greece lasted from 28 October 1940 to 30 April 1941. Italian forces invaded Greece and made limited gains. But soon the Greeks counter-attacked and the Italians were driven back to the Albanian border. The Italians spent much of the winter stabilizing a line which left them in control of only about two-thirds of Albania. A much anticipated Italian offensive in March 1941 resulted in few territorial gains. Germany, led by Adolf Hitler, intervened in April and invaded Greece after the successful invasion of Yugoslavia.

Invasion of Yugoslavia

The invasion of Yugoslavia (also known as "Operation 25") began on 6 April 1941 and ended with the unconditional surrender of the Royal Yugoslav Army on 17 April. The invading Axis powers (Nazi Germany, Fascist Italy, and Hungary) occupied and dismembered the Kingdom of Yugoslavia. By cobbling together Bosnia and Herzegovina, some parts of Croatia, and Syrmia, the "Independent State of Croatia" (Nezavisna Država Hrvatska, NDH) was created by Germany and Italy. In some of the territory of the former Kingdom of Serbia and the Banat, the German-occupied Territory of the Military Commander in Serbia, the Germans appointed a puppet government, the Government of National Salvation led by Milan Nedić. Montenegro remained under Italian occupation, and Bulgaria was permitted to annex eastern areas of Yugoslavia, including most of modern-day North Macedonia.

Battle of Greece

Hitler began planning to invade Greece in November 1940, after the British occupied Crete and Lemnos. He ordered the German Invasion of Greece — code-named Unternehmen Marita (Operation Marita) by Nazi Germany — on 13 December 1940 for execution in March 1941. The stated aim of the operation was to prevent the British from getting air bases within striking range of the Romanian oilfields. On 6 April 1941, the German Army invaded northern Greece, while other elements launched an attack against Yugoslavia. Breaking through the Yugoslav lines in southern Yugoslavia allowed Germany to send reinforcements to the battlefields of northern Greece. The German army out-flanked the Greek Metaxas Line fortifications and, despite the assistance provided by a British expeditionary corps, set out to capture the southern Greek cities. The Battle of Greece ended with the German entry into Athens and the capture of the Peloponnese, although about 40,000 Allied soldiers were evacuated to Crete, prompting one of the largest airborne attacks in the history of warfare: Operation Merkur, or the Battle of Crete.

Battle of Crete

On 20 May 1941, German paratroopers were dropped over the airfields of northern Crete to occupy the island. They were met by heavy resistance from Allied forces and the local Cretan population but eventually the defenders were overwhelmed by the German forces. The British Government ordered an evacuation on 27 May and the remaining forces surrendered on 1 June. However, the heavy losses incurred by the paratroopers convinced the Supreme Command of the Wehrmacht to abandon large-scale airborne operations for the remainder of the war.

Result

By 1 June 1941, all of Albania, Yugoslavia and Greece were under Axis control. Greece was placed under triple occupation, and Yugoslavia was dissolved and occupied. Germany had gained a significant strategic advantage: direct access to the Mediterranean.

Bulgarian occupation

On 6 April 1941, despite having officially joined the Axis Powers, the Bulgarian government did not participate in the invasion of Yugoslavia and the Battle of Greece. On 20 April, the Bulgarian Army occupied most of Western Thrace and the Greek province of Eastern Macedonia, which had been already conquered by Germany, with the goal of restoring its pre-World War I outlet to the Aegean Sea. Bulgarian troops also occupied much of eastern Serbia, where Vardar Banovina was divided between Bulgaria and the Italians.

Resistance movements

Throughout the remainder of the war, active Yugoslav, Greek, and Albanian resistance movements forced Germany and its allies to garrison hundreds of thousands of soldiers permanently in the three countries, denying them to the other fronts. Especially in Yugoslavia after 1943, the threat of an Allied invasion and the activities of the partisans necessitated large-scale counter-insurgency operations, involving several divisions.

See also
Adriatic campaign of World War II

References

External links

 The Fate of the Jews in South-Eastern Europe During the First Years of the War  on the Yad Vashem website
 Summaries WORLD WAR II in the BALKANS
 Timeline of the Balkans Campaign
 World War Two Online Newspaper Archives — The Invasion of the Balkans: Yugoslavia, Greece and Crete, 1940-1941
 World War II in the Balkans

 
Wars involving the Balkans
World War II campaigns of the Mediterranean Theatre
Middle East theatre of World War II
Albania in World War II
Greece in World War II
Greek Macedonia in World War II
Yugoslav Macedonia in World War II
Yugoslavia in World War II
Conflicts in 1940
Conflicts in 1941
1941 in Greece
1942 in Greece
1941 in Yugoslavia
1942 in Yugoslavia
Eastern European theatre of World War II
Campaigns, operations and battles of World War II involving the United Kingdom
Military campaigns involving Germany
Military history of Greece during World War II
Military history of Yugoslavia during World War II
Modern history of the Balkans